Victoria Carrasco García (born 6 March 1946) is a Honduran politician. She currently serves as deputy of the National Congress of Honduras representing the National Party of Honduras for Cortés.

References

1946 births
Living people
People from Cortés Department
Deputies of the National Congress of Honduras
National Party of Honduras politicians
21st-century Honduran women politicians
21st-century Honduran politicians